The prisoner's dilemma is a standard example in game theory. 

Prisoner's dilemma may also refer to: 

 Prisoner's Dilemma (novel), a 1988 novel by Richard Powers
 The Prisoner's Dilemma (audio drama), a 2009 audiobook based on Doctor Who
 The Prisoner's Dilemma (play), a 2001 play by David Edgar
 "Prisoner's Dilemma" (Person of Interest), a 2013 television episode
 "The Prisoner's Dilemma" (Prison Break), a 2017 television episode
 "The Prisoner's Dilemma" (Voltron: Legendary Defender), a 2018 television episode

See also
 Innocent prisoner's dilemma, a detrimental effect of a legal system in which admission of guilt can result in a lesser punishment